Alpine may refer to any mountainous region. It may also refer to:

Places

Europe
 Alps, a European mountain range
 Alpine states, which overlap with the European range

Australia
 Alpine, New South Wales, a Northern Village
 Alpine National Park
 Alpine Shire, a local government area in Victoria

New Zealand
 Alpine Lake / Ata Puai, a lake in the West Coast Region of New Zealand

United States
 Alpine, DeKalb County, Alabama, an unincorporated community
 Alpine, Talladega County, Alabama, an unincorporated community
 Alpine (plantation), a historic plantation house in Talladega County, Alabama
 Alpine, Alaska, an unincorporated community
 Alpine, Arizona, an unincorporated community
 Alpine, California, a census-designated place (CDP) in San Diego County
 Alpine, Los Angeles County, California, a former unincorporated community also known as Harold
 Alpine County, California
 Lake Alpine, California, an unincorporated community
 Alpine, Georgia, an unincorporated community
 Alpine, Indiana, an unincorporated community
 Alpine Township, Michigan
 Alpine, Mississippi, an unincorporated community
 Alpine, New Jersey, a borough
 Alpine, Oregon, an unincorporated community
 Alpine, Tennessee, an unincorporated community
 Alpine, Texas, a city
 Alpine, Utah, a city
 Alpine, Virginia, an unincorporated community
Alpine, King County, Washington, a former town abandoned in 1929
 Alpine, Skagit County, Washington, two former villages, one each in the 19th and 20th centuries
 Alpine, Wyoming, a town

Lakes
 Lake Alpine, a lake in Alpine County, California
 Alpine Lake (Marin County, California), a reservoir in Marin County, California
 Alpine Lake (Central Sawtooth Wilderness), a glacial lake in Custer County, Idaho
 Alpine Lake (Northern Sawtooth Wilderness), a glacial lake in Custer County, Idaho

Science and technology

Biology
 Alpine (goat), a breed of domestic goat
 Alpine plant, plants that grow at high elevations
 Erebia or Alpine butterfly, a genus of butterflies common in the Rocky Mountains of North America
 Parnassius or Alpine butterfly, a genus of butterflies in Eurasia
 Alpine fir (Abies lasiocarpa, or subalpine fir), a tree
 Alpine newt

Computing
 Alpine (email client), a free software email client
 Alpine Linux, a Linux distribution

Earth sciences
 Alpine climate, climate that is typical to higher altitudes
 Alpine tundra, a type of natural region or biome
 Alpine orogeny, in geology
 Alpine Fault, a geological fault running nearly the entire length of New Zealand's South Island

Sport
 Alpine climbing, a branch of climbing in which the primary aim is very often to reach the summit of a mountain
 Alpine F1 Team, a Formula One team and constructor
 Alpine Rally, a rally competition
 Alpine style, mountaineering in a self-sufficient manner
 Alpine skiing, also known as downhill skiing
 Alpine slide, a long chute on the side of a hill, usually built by ski resorts

Transportation

Automobiles
 Automobiles Alpine, a French manufacturer of cars
 Alpine Electronics, a Japanese manufacturer of car audio and navigation systems
 Sunbeam Alpine, a sports car
 Chrysler Alpine, the compact car Simca 1307 in the UK
 Alpine F1 Team, Formula One team from 2021 onwards
 Alpine Academy, young driver programme run by the Formula One team

Aviation
 Alpine Air Express, an American airline
 Auster Alpine, a 1950s British airplane

Art, entertainment and media
 Alpine (band), an indie rock band from Melbourne, Australia
 Alpine (G.I. Joe), a fictional character in the G.I. Joe universe

Other uses
 Alpine race, a historical ethnicity concept
 Alpine Elementary School (disambiguation)
 Alpine, a subdialect of Vivaro-Alpine within the Occitan language
 Alpine, a number of brands of beer produced by the Moosehead Brewery
 Alpine, a menthol cigarette brand once made by Philip Morris USA

See also

 Geology of the Alps
 Alpine butterfly (disambiguation)
 Alpine Journal, a publication by the Alpine Club of London
 Alpin (disambiguation)
 Alpen (disambiguation)
 Swiss chalet style, an architectural style originally inspired by rural chalets in Switzerland and the Alpine regions of Central Europe